Events in the year 1232 in Norway.

Incumbents
Monarch: Haakon IV Haakonsson

Events

Arts and literature

Births
10 November – Haakon the Young, (Junior) King (died 1257).

Deaths

References

Norway